The 2022 Vuelta a España was the 77th edition of Vuelta a España, one of cycling's Grand Tours. The Vuelta began in Utrecht on 19 August, and Stage 12 from Salobreña to Peñas Blancas occurred on 1 September. The race finished in Madrid on 11 September.

Classification standings

Stage 12 
1 September 2022 – Salobreña to Peñas Blancas, 

The twelfth stage featured the race's fourth summit finish as the riders headed towards the climb of Peñas Blancas. The first  were mostly flat before the riders tackled an uncategorized climb. Following the descent, the riders went towards the intermediate sprint at Estepona with  left, with the sprint offering bonus seconds to the first three riders across. Shortly after, the riders began the climb of the first-category Peñas Blancas.

The biggest GC threat from the break was Wilco Kelderman, who was 14' 04" down. Initially,  and  controlled the gap but they gradually let the gap go out to 10 minutes. With  remaining, Samuele Battistella attacked from the break. He had a lead of almost a minute but he was eventually brought back by the rest of the break. Meanwhile, in the peloton, the race leader, Remco Evenepoel went down together with his teammate, Ilan Van Wilder. Both riders were not injured and they eventually made it back to the peloton. Evenepoel's crash caused the break's advantage to increase to  minutes, which meant that Kelderman was second in the virtual GC at one point in the stage. At the foot of the climb of Peñas Blancas, the break still had an advantage of 10 minutes.

On the climb, the  duo of Lionel Taminiaux and Gianni Vermeersch set the pace for Jay Vine before Matteo Fabbro took over at the front of the break. His pace thinned out the break until Elie Gesbert attacked inside the final . After he was brought back, Jan Polanc made an unsuccessful attack before Gesbert went again. At this point, Vine began to drop from the front group. Just under the -to-go mark, Richard Carapaz launched his attack. Gesbert and Kelderman tried to go in pursuit of Carapaz but the Ecuadorian gradually increased his lead. He would not be caught as he took his first Vuelta stage win. Kelderman crossed the line in second at nine seconds down while Marc Soler, who was initially dropped, came back to finish third at 24 seconds down.

Meanwhile, in the peloton,  continued to pace the peloton before  took over on the climb. Further up the climb,  took over the pacemaking before Enric Mas accelerated from the peloton. Evenepoel and Miguel Ángel López were immediately on his wheel but Primož Roglič, Carlos Rodríguez, and Juan Ayuso gradually caught up with them. Inside the final , Rodríguez tried to make his move but he did not gap the rest of the group. Towards the line, Rodríguez and López were dropped by Evenepoel's pace. Evenepoel, Roglič, Mas, and Ayuso finished seven and a half minutes down while López and Rodríguez lost six and 11 seconds, respectively. The rest of the contenders lost between 28 seconds and around a minute and a half.

In the GC, Evenepoel kept the red jersey, maintaining his advantage over Roglič, Mas, and Ayuso. Despite losing 11 seconds, Rodríguez kept his fourth place. With their time gains from the break, Kelderman and Polanc entered the top ten at sixth and ninth, respectively. Another change was López overtaking João Almeida for seventh place while Tao Geoghegan Hart dropped to tenth.

Stage 13 
2 September 2022 – Ronda to Montilla, 

The thirteenth stage featured a transition stage from Ronda to Montilla. There were no categorized climbs on the route but the entirety of the stage had a rolling terrain with several lumps on the route. Near the finish, the riders went up two short climbs, including one in the final  which averaged 5 percent.

Before the stage, it was reported that Juan Ayuso, who was fifth on GC, tested positive for COVID-19. However, a PCR test deemed that he had a low risk of infectivity and thus, he remained in the race. Immediately as the stage started, Joan Bou, Ander Okamika, and Julius van den Berg broke away from the peloton. The peloton quickly gave the break an advantage of around two and a half minutes before the sprinters' teams controlled the gap. Soon, the gap went past three minutes before the peloton began to decrease the break's advantage. Right after the riders went past the intermediate sprint, van den Berg was dropped from the break before getting swept by the peloton, with the other two also getting caught shortly after. The bunch soon headed towards an inevitable sprint, with  leading the peloton into the final kilometer as they teed up Primož Roglič for the uphill drag to the line. On the uphill section,  began their lead out before Pascal Ackermann launched an early sprint. Mads Pedersen went after him before going past the German near the finish. Pedersen would not be caught as he took the stage win. Bryan Coquard had a late surge to finish second while Ackermann held on for third. All the GC contenders finished in the front group as Remco Evenepoel kept the red jersey ahead of a weekend of mountain stages.

Stage 14 
3 September 2022 – Montoro to Sierra de La Pandera, 

The race returned to the mountains on the fourteenth stage as the riders headed towards a summit finish at Sierra de La Pandera. The first  were mostly flat before the riders gradually climbed towards the foot of the third-category Puerto de Siete Pilillas. Following the descent, the riders passed through the intermediate sprint with  left. After an uncategorized climb, the riders reached the foot of the second-category Puerto de Los Villares, a  climb with an average of 5.5 percent. As the riders crested the top, which offered bonus seconds, there was a  plateau section before the final climb, the first-category Sierra de La Pandera. Towards the top, there was a short descent before once again ramping up near the finish line.

The start of the stage was marked by a long fight for the break. It took more than  before an attack by Richard Carapaz and Alexey Lutsenko got some leeway from the peloton. They were joined by eight other riders to form the break of the day. As the break reached the intermediate sprint, Mads Pedersen took maximum points to further extend his lead in the points classification. The advantage hovered around four minutes as the riders headed towards the foot of the penultimate climb, the Puerto de Los Villares. On the climb, the break began to split with the riders beginning to attack each other. Towards the top, Luis León Sánchez got a gap over his breakaway companions, taking a 15-second lead at the top. On the short plateau section before the final climb, Carapaz caught up with Sánchez out front. They were soon joined by Clément Champoussin and Filippo Conca to form a quartet up front. He would not be caught as he took his second stage win in a span of three days.

Meanwhile, in the peloton,  continued to pace the peloton until they reached the climb of Puerto de Los Villares. In the middle of the climb,  took over at the front of the peloton, eating into the break's advantage. The peloton continued to thin out before Primož Roglič attacked with around  remaining. The race leader, Remco Evenepoel tried to bring Roglič back but it soon appeared that he was struggling as the other contenders began to drop him. Roglič was soon joined by Enric Mas and Miguel Ángel López, with the trio increasing their lead over Evenepoel. Near the top, Mas was dropped as Roglič and López tried to catch Carapaz. They eventually fell short by seven seconds, with López and Roglič taking second and third, respectively. João Almeida passed and dropped Mas, finishing a further 19 seconds behind while Mas and Carlos Rodríguez finished 28 seconds behind López and Roglič. Thymen Arensman was 43 seconds down while five seconds later, Evenepoel finished with Juan Ayuso, who suffered from an untimely puncture on the climb.

In the GC, Evenepoel retained the red jersey with a reduced advantage of 1' 49" on Roglič, who gained 52 seconds on the Belgian, including bonus seconds. Mas and Rodríguez gained 20 seconds and retained their GC positions while Ayuso rounded out the top five. López and Almeida moved up to sixth and seventh, respectively, having overtaken Wilco Kelderman, who lost more than a minute. Tao Geoghegan Hart moved up to ninth while Ben O'Connor moved inside the top ten.

Stage 15 
4 September 2022 – Martos to Sierra Nevada, 

The fifteenth stage featured the race's queen stage, with the riders heading towards the highest point of this year's Vuelta at Sierra Nevada. The first  were mostly flat before the riders went up the third-category Puerto del Castillo. Following an undulating section and a valley section, the riders passed through the intermediate sprint in Granada with  left. Bonus seconds were on offer at the top of the climb,  from the finish. Following the descent, the riders faced an uncategorized climb before reaching the foot of the final climb of the day, the special-category Alto Hoya de la Mora, a  climb with an average of 7.9 percent. The riders headed to the top via the Alto de Hazallanas, with the first  of the climb averaging more than 10 percent.

At the start of the stage, six riders got a gap over the rest of the peloton. As the riders continued attacking, there was a crash that involved Wilco Kelderman, who suffered from bruises but was able to get back to the peloton. Up front, only Rohan Dennis, Vincenzo Nibali, and Hugh Carthy remained until they were eventually joined by 26 other riders to form the break of the day. The best-placed GC man in the break was Thymen Arensman, who was only 9' 14" down.  soon began to control the peloton, allowing the gap to reach six minutes before  took over as Arensman threatened Ben O'Connor's place on GC. He extended his lead over the chasers to around a minute and a half as he reached the penultimate climb, the Alto del Purche. Eventually, Jay Vine accelerated out of the chasing group. He caught Craddock near the top before sprinting to take the maximum KOM points, adding to his lead in the KOM classification.

With  to go, the lead duo was caught by the reduced chasing group, with the peloton five minutes behind. At the bottom of the final climb, Marc Soler attacked the break, going solo out front. He led by as much as 50 seconds over the chasing group, which was reduced to just seven riders.  from the finish, Arensman attacked out of the chasing group. He caught up with Soler with  left before dropping the Spaniard after a few hundred meters. Arensman gradually increased his gap over the chasers to almost a minute and a half. He maintained his advantage all the way to the finish to win his first Grand Tour stage.

In the peloton,  continued to pace the group before  took control of the pace near the foot of the final climb. The team set a furious pace on the bottom of the climb, splitting the peloton into pieces. As the dust settled, most of the top seven riders on GC, as well as O'Connor, remained in the red jersey group. The only exceptions were the  duo of Juan Ayuso and João Almeida, who were dangling separately at around half a minute back. Towards the end of the steep section of the climb, Carlos Rodríguez was dropped from the main group. Remco Evenepoel took up most of the pacemaking in the group before linking up with his teammate, Louis Vervaeke, who was in the break.  from the finish, Miguel Ángel López accelerated from the red jersey group, followed soon after by Enric Mas. Both riders made their way towards the remnants of the break, increasing their lead to around half a minute over Evenepoel, who had Primož Roglič and O'Connor with him. Inside the last , Roglič and O'Connor dropped Evenepoel, with both riders eventually gaining 15 seconds on the race leader but also losing 27 seconds to Mas, including bonus seconds. Meanwhile, Ayuso and Almeida were able to catch and drop Rodríguez, with Ayuso eventually passing Evenepoel towards the finish while Almeida finished just 11 seconds down on the Belgian.

In the GC, Evenepoel kept the red jersey by a margin of 1' 34" over Roglič while Mas's time gains allowed him to move within 2' 01" of the race lead. Ayuso moved up to fourth after he gained more than a minute and a half on Rodríguez. López retained sixth place but his deficit to Rodríguez for fifth place was reduced to just eight seconds. Almeida limited his losses to retain his seventh place while Arensman and Jai Hindley moved back inside the top ten after being in the break. O'Connor's strong ride also allowed him to move up a place into ninth.

Rest day 3 
5 September 2022 – Sanlúcar de Barrameda

Stage 16 
6 September 2022 – Sanlúcar de Barrameda to Tomares, 

Following the last rest day, the riders tackled a flat stage that featured the penultimate chance for the sprinters to challenge for the stage win. The stage was mostly flat throughout but there two small lumps in the last  that could spark some late attacks. The riders passed through the intermediate sprint with  left, with the sprint offering bonus seconds. The finish of the stage was slightly uphill.

As soon as the stage started, Ander Okamika and Luis Ángel Maté attacked out of the peloton. As the riders came closer to the finish, the lead duo's advantage gradually came down. Close to the intermediate sprint, the break's lead stood at less than a minute. Maté and Okamika took the maximum points while Mads Pedersen took third place to further extend his lead in the points classification. The break hovered out front until they were reeled in with  remaining. Shortly after both riders were caught, Ibai Azurmendi attacked but he was quickly brought back.

The sprinters' teams and the GC teams soon took station at the front of the peloton. As the riders tackled a short climb inside the final , Primož Roglič accelerated out of the peloton. Pascal Ackermann was the only rider able to follow him while Pedersen, who had Danny van Poppel and Fred Wright with him, went off in pursuit of the two. They eventually caught up with the lead duo to make it five out front, holding a small gap over the peloton. Meanwhile, from behind, the race leader, Remco Evenepoel, suffered a puncture but his mechanical happened in the last , which meant that he was credited with the same time as the main peloton. Up front, Roglič led out the group as he attempted to increase his gap over the other GC contenders. As the lead quintet sprinted for the win, Roglič collided with Wright, causing the former to crash heavily while the latter was able to stay upright. Amidst the chaos, Pedersen launched his sprint and no one came around him as he took his second stage win. Ackermann finished second while van Poppel took third. The reduced peloton finished eight seconds down while Roglič, who was credited with the same time as the lead group, crossed the line with several cuts on his right side. In the GC, Evenepoel kept the red jersey, with his advantage over Roglič reduced by eight seconds. The rest of the top ten remained unchanged.

Stage 17 
7 September 2022 – Aracena to Monasterio de Tentudía, 

The seventeenth stage featured another uphill finish as the riders finished atop the Monasterio de Tentudía. Almost the entirety of the stage was ridden on a rolling terrain with almost no flat kilometers. With  left, the riders passed through the intermediate sprint, which offered bonus seconds to the first three riders across. Afterwards, the riders headed towards the only categorized climb of the day, the second-category Monasterio de Tentudía. The last  of the climb has an average of 7.6 percent.

Before the start of the stage, the big news on the day was the abandonment of Primož Roglič, who was second in the GC, as a consequence of his crash before the finish the previous day. After the flag dropped, multiple riders attempted the get into the break before a group of 13 riders managed to build a significant gap over the peloton. The best-placed GC rider in the break was Rigoberto Urán, who was 14' 56" down. Just as the break was getting established, Juan Ayuso, who was virtually third on GC, was involved in a crash but he managed to escape unscathed.  set a steady pace in the peloton for the majority of the stage, allowing the break to extend their advantage to seven and a half minutes. As the riders headed towards the final climb, the break maintained their seven-minute advantage over the peloton, making it certain that the stage would be fought between the breakaway riders.

With  to go, Lawson Craddock attacked out of the break. He launched more attacks until he pried himself from his breakaway companions with  remaining. His lead hovered around 20 seconds over the chasing group, which began to split as the attacks started to come. Six riders emerged as the strongest chasers but Craddock still maintained his gap heading into the climb's steepest section. Going into the final , Jesús Herrada, Quentin Pacher, Kenny Elissonde, Clément Champoussin, Marc Soler, and Uran were around 10 seconds behind Craddock, who was eventually reeled back before the final kilometer. Just as Craddock was caught, Champoussin immediately attacked but Herrada caught him before attacking himself. Uran went off in pursuit of Herrada, catching the Spaniard before sprinting for the stage win. Uran held off a fast-finishing Pacher to win the stage, completing his set of taking a stage win at all three Grand Tours.

Meanwhile, in the peloton, the riders rode a steady pace ahead of the final climb. As they reached the climb's steepest section, Enric Mas tried to launch several attacks but Remco Evenepoel was immediately on his wheel. After a while, João Almeida attacked, forcing Miguel Ángel López to give chase. Almeida eventually finished nine seconds ahead of Evenepoel and Mas, who was two seconds further ahead of Ayuso. The rest of the contenders finished between four and 14 seconds behind Evenepoel while Thymen Arensman lost 41 seconds. In the GC, with Roglič's withdrawal, Evenepoel's lead over Mas in second place was now two minutes while Ayuso moved up inside the podium. Almeida gained 18 seconds on López to move to within 1' 18" of the Colombian's fifth place. Uran gained more than five minutes with his ride in the break, allowing him to move up into ninth on GC.

Stage 18 
8 September 2022 – Trujillo to Alto del Piornal, 

The eighteenth stage featured the last summit finish of the race as the riders finished atop the Alto del Piornal. The terrain on the first  was mostly undulating before the riders went up an uncategorized climb. Following the descent and a valley section, the riders passed through the intermediate sprint with  left. At the top,  from the finish, there were bonus seconds on offer to the first three riders across. After the descent and a short flat section, the riders climbed up a different side of the Alto del Piornal.

There was another furious fight for the breakaway as it took more than  before a large 41-man break escaped from the peloton. There was no GC threat in the break since the best-placed GC rider was Richard Carapaz, who was more than 26 minutes down on GC. As the fight for the break was ongoing, there was a crash that involved several riders in the peloton, including Jay Vine, Mads Pedersen, and Carlos Rodríguez. The biggest victim of the crash was Vine, who was forced to abandon the race, meaning that the KOM jersey passed on to Carapaz, who was second in the classification. As a consequence of the crash, Rodríguez also suffered cuts and bruises on his body, but he was able to make it back to the peloton. Almeida led the peloton by more than a minute before  took up the chase, with Miguel Ángel López's position being threatened by Almeida. At the top of Alto de la Desesperá, the break led Almeida by almost five minutes, with the peloton a further minute down.

On the way to the first ascent of Alto del Piornal, Clément Russo attacked out of the break, building a lead of almost a minute. His lead gradually went down before he was caught just before the Alto del Piornal. At the foot of the climb, Hugh Carthy accelerated from the break. Sergio Higuita and Thibaut Pinot soon bridged up to him while a chase group composed of Carapaz, Robert Gesink, and Élie Gesbert formed behind them. With  to go, the trio of chasers caught up with the lead trio before Carapaz took the maximum KOM points to extend his virtual lead in the KOM classification. Almeida crossed the top with his teammate, Marc Soler, at around three minutes down while the red jersey group was around less than a minute down on the Portuguese. The only GC contenders missing from the group was Rodríguez, who was suffering from the effects of his crash. On the descent, Almeida and Soler caught up with the remnants of the break, which was almost three minutes down on the lead sextet. Meanwhile, Rodríguez made it back to the red jersey group, which was hovering around 40 seconds down on Almeida. At the foot of the second ascent of Alto del Piornal, the lead group led the Almeida group by a minute and a half, with the red jersey group a further half a minute down.

On the bottom of the climb, Gesbert attacked from the lead group. He built an advantage of around half a minute before Gesink went off in pursuit of him. Ben O'Connor and Thymen Arensman also attacked from the peloton, gapping the other contenders and dropping Rodríguez as a result. The other contenders, minus Rodríguez, gradually caught up with Evenepoel, with the red jersey group trailing the lead duo by less than a minute. With around  left, Gesink dropped Gesbert to go in pursuit of the stage win. His lead over the red jersey group gradually decreased as attacks started to fly from the group. With just over a kilometre left, Mas launched an attack that was only answered by Evenepoel while Gesink's lead was down to around 20 seconds. The duo eventually caught up with Gesink in the final hundred metres before Evenepoel launched his sprint. He gapped Mas and Gesink by two seconds to win his second stage of the race. The group containing most of the other GC contenders finished 13 seconds down while Rodríguez lost more than a minute. In the GC, Evenepoel extended his lead over Mas by six seconds with his time gap and bonus seconds. López overhauled Rodríguez into fourth while Almeida moved to within 25 seconds of Rodríguez's position in fifth.

Stage 19 
9 September 2022 – Talavera de la Reina to Talavera de la Reina,

Stage 20 
10 September 2022 – Moralzarzal to Puerto de Navacerrada,

Stage 21 
11 September 2022 – Las Rozas to Madrid,

References

External links 

2022 Vuelta a España
Vuelta a España stages